One-Trick Pony is the fifth solo studio album by Paul Simon released in 1980. It was Simon's first album for Warner Bros. Records, and his first new studio album since 1975's Still Crazy After All These Years. His back catalog from Columbia Records would also move to Warner Bros. as a result of his signing with the label.

Paul Simon's One-Trick Pony was released concurrently with the film of the same name, in which Simon also starred. Despite their similarities, the album and film are musically distinct: each features different versions of the same songs, as well as certain songs that appear exclusively on either the film or the album. The album is best known for the Grammy-nominated track "Late in the Evening" which was a hit for Simon in 1980, peaking at No. 6 in the United States. The title track was also released as a single and became a U.S. Top 40 hit. Both songs were also Top 20 hits on the U.S. Adult Contemporary chart. Two of the tracks (the title song and "Ace in the Hole") were recorded live at the Agora Theatre and Ballroom in Cleveland, Ohio in September 1979, while the rest are studio cuts.

Several session musicians appearing on the album also appeared in the movie as the character Jonah's backing band: guitarist Eric Gale, pianist Richard Tee, bassist Tony Levin and drummer Steve Gadd. Simon toured Europe and America in 1980 with this band in support of the album, with one concert from Philadelphia recorded on video and released on VHS under the title "Paul Simon in Concert", then subsequently on DVD under 2 different titles for the same concert footage ("Live at the Tower Theatre" and "Live from Philadelphia").

In 2004, One-Trick Pony was remastered and re-released by Warner Bros. Records. This reissue contains four bonus tracks, including "Soft Parachutes" and "Spiral Highway" (an early version of "How the Heart Approaches What It Yearns") both of which were featured in the film but were missing from the original album release. Also included in the re-release were the outtake of "All Because of You" (an early version of "Oh, Marion" that would also spawn "God Bless the Absentee") and "Stranded in a Limousine", which originally appeared on the 1977 compilation Greatest Hits, Etc..

Album title
The title is a colloquial American expression meaning a person specializing in only one area, having only one talent, or of limited ability.

Hit singles
The album yielded two hit singles:  "Late in the Evening" (US #6, AC #7) and "One-Trick Pony" (US #40, AC #17).

Billboard said of "One Trick Pony" that "The mellow jazz flavored arrangement features superb guitar, keyboard and percussive support while Simon delivers a convincing vocal performance." Record World said that "Simon sings about the fate of an aging rocker while Eric Gale's lyrical guitar adds emphasis on this superb title cut."  Record World also praised the song's hook.

"Oh, Marion" didn't chart but Record World called it a "masterpiece" and said that this "pretty ballad is filled with memorable lyrical passages and instrumental subtleties."

Track listing
All songs were written by Paul Simon.

Side one

Side two

2004 re-release
 "Soft Parachutes" – 1:53
 "All Because of You" – 4:06
 "Spiral Highway" – 2:56
 "Stranded in a Limousine" – 3:10

Personnel
Paul Simon – vocals, nylon string guitar, electric guitar, percussion, acoustic guitar on "Stranded in a Limousine" (2004 reissue only), horn and string arrangements
Eric Gale – electric guitar, nylon string guitar on "How the Heart Approaches What it Yearns"
Richard Tee – Fender Rhodes, piano on "God Bless the Absentee" and "Stranded in a Limousine" (2004 reissue only), tambourine, background vocals and co-lead vocal on "Ace in the Hole"
Tony Levin – bass guitar on all songs except where noted
Steve Gadd – drums on all songs, percussion on "Stranded in a Limousine" (2004 reissue only)
Patti Austin – vocals
Joe Beck – electric guitar on "Long Long Day"
Hiram Bullock – slide guitar on "That's Why God Made the Movies"
Jon Faddis – flugelhorn on "Oh, Marion"
Bob Friedman – horn and string arrangements
Don Grolnick – synthesizer on "That's Why God Made the Movies"
Lani Groves – background vocals
Dave Grusin – horn and string arrangements
Anthony Jackson – bass on "Oh Marion"
Ralph MacDonald – percussion
Hugh McCracken – acoustic guitar
Jeff Mironov – electric guitar on "Oh, Marion"
John Tropea – acoustic guitar on "Jonah"
Michael Brecker – saxophone on "Stranded in a Limousine" (2004 reissue only)
Randy Brecker – trumpet on "Stranded in a Limousine" (2004 reissue only)
Jaroslav Jakubovič - Saxophone 
Gordon Edwards – bass guitar on "Stranded in a Limousine" (2004 reissue only)
Irwin "Marky" Markowitz – trumpet on "Stranded in a Limousine" (2004 reissue only)
David Sanborn – saxophone on "Stranded in a Limousine" (2004 reissue only)
Marvin Stamm – trumpet on "Stranded in a Limousine" (2004 reissue only)
Technical
Paul Simon, Phil Ramone - producers
Jim Boyer - recording engineer, mixing engineer
Ted Jensen - mastering engineer

Charts

Weekly charts

Year-end charts

Certifications

Accolades

Grammy Awards 

|-
| width="35" align="center"|1981 || "Late in the Evening" || | Best Pop Vocal Performance - Male || 
|-

Cover versions
The String Cheese Incident have covered the song "Late In the Evening" on numerous occasions, with drummer Michael Travis on vocals.
Peter Mulvey covered "Stranded In a Limousine" on his album Ten Thousand Mornings.

In popular culture
The album is mentioned on the thank you page of Douglas Adams' novel The Restaurant at the End of the Universe.
The Victoria, B.C. band Immaculate Machine takes their name from the lyrics of the track "One-Trick Pony".

References

External links
One-Trick Pony at the Internet Movie Database

1980 soundtrack albums
Paul Simon albums
Albums arranged by Dave Grusin
Albums produced by Phil Ramone
Albums produced by Paul Simon
Drama film soundtracks
Warner Records soundtracks